John Hansen Christensen (born 29 April 1948) is a former field hockey player who was a member of the New Zealand national team that won the gold at the 1976 Summer Olympics in Montreal. He was born in Christchurch.

References

External links
 

1948 births
Living people
New Zealand male field hockey players
New Zealand field hockey coaches
Olympic field hockey players of New Zealand
Olympic gold medalists for New Zealand
Field hockey players at the 1968 Summer Olympics
Field hockey players at the 1972 Summer Olympics
Field hockey players at the 1976 Summer Olympics
Field hockey players from Christchurch
Olympic medalists in field hockey
Medalists at the 1976 Summer Olympics